The term synchronizer may refer to:

 In automobiles, a synchronizer is part of a synchromesh manual transmission that allows the smooth engagement of gears.
 In aerial warfare, a synchronizer is a device that permits an automatic weapon to fire between the blades of a revolving propeller. 
 In electronics, an arbiter helps order signals in asynchronous circuits.  There are also electronic digital circuits called synchronizers that attempt to perform arbitration in one clock cycle.  Synchronizers, unlike arbiters, are prone to failure.  (See metastability in electronics.)
 In electronics, whenever there is signal transfer between two systems operating at different frequencies or same frequency with different phases, synchronizer block is used as an interface so that signal from transmitter block is reliably   interpreted by the receiver. The block usually uses metastable hardened flops offering single or double latency delays at the output. This block ensures that there is no metastability for a target MTBF i.e., Mean Time Between Failures 
 In film editing, a synchronizer is a device for aligning multiple film strips in a replay or editing device.
 In computer science, a synchronizer is an algorithm that can be applied to a synchronous distributed algorithm to produce a version that operates in asynchronous networks.

See also
 Synchrony (disambiguation)
 Synchronicity (disambiguation)
 Synchronization

Synchronization